Kenneth Paul Block (July 26, 1924 – April 23, 2009) was an American fashion illustrator.  For nearly forty years, he was an in-house artist for Fairchild Publications, owner of Women's Wear Daily, the garment industry trade paper, and its offshoot, W.  As chief features artist, he helped transform the once-dowdy WWD into the bible of the jet set during the 1960s and 1970s. Babe Paley, Gloria Vanderbilt, Jacqueline de Ribes, Amanda Burden,  The Duchess of Windsor, and Gloria Guinness were among the society women who posed for him.

Block's incisive yet graceful brushstrokes captured the most important styles of the post-war era, including collections by Norman Norell, Yves Saint Laurent, Pierre Cardin, Coco Chanel, James Galanos, Givenchy, Pauline Trigère, Bill Blass, Halston, and Geoffrey Beene. In the introduction to Drawing Fashion: The Art of Kenneth Paul Block, published in 2008, Isaac Mizrahi described Block's influence: "More than any single designer, he gave New York fashion its sophistication. Because he drew Babe Paley and Jackie Kennedy a certain way, they became what he had envisioned."

Block often drew under intense deadline pressure. In the May 2009 issue of Vogue, photographer Steven Meisel, who began his career as a fashion artist, recalled Block's composure: "He would sit there with this long cigarette holder and a polka-dot bow tie, always a sports jacket, immaculate. He never lost his temper. He had so much style, so much class, so much chic."

Born in New Rochelle, he grow up in Larchmont, New York in the 1930s. Block was enthralled by the glamorous film stars of the era and by the great fashion artists then working for Vogue and Harper's Bazaar. Dance and music also influenced his developing artistic style. In 1945, he graduated from the Parsons School of Design.

Block joined Fairchild Publications in the mid-1950s. Early assignments included sketching New York ladies on Easter Sunday as they exited churches in their holiday finery, hats and gloves included. As the gentility of the 1950s gave way to the anarchic sixties and beyond, he always kept pace, though he regretted the loss of dignity in fashion; he missed hats and gloves.

Even before Block's career began, photography had overtaken fashion illustration as the primary method of introducing new styles. Block helped keep his métier alive. He stayed with Fairchild until 1992 when all the company's artists were let go on the same day.

Concurrent with his editorial work, and for a dozen years after his career at Fairchild ended, Block created a prodigious portfolio of commercial fashion art, including drawings made during successive long-term contracts with three of New York's best-known specialty stores—Bonwit Teller, Bergdorf Goodman, and Lord & Taylor. Other commercial clients included Halston, Perry Ellis, and Coach. When Diana Vreeland joined the Metropolitan Museum of Art's Costume Institute, she immediately turned to Block to draw the poster for her first exhibit on Cristóbal Balenciaga. He also created a drawing for Vreeland's "American Women of Style" exhibit.

The women in Block's drawings were known for exuding a passive sort of chic. "Gesture to me is everything in fashion," he said. His long-term companion was Morton Ribyat.

References

External links 
 Official web site for Kenneth Paul Block collection of works
 Cover of Fashion Show a novel by Block's colleague James Brady
 New York Observer, May 23, 1999
 The Advocate, June 22, 1999

1924 births
2009 deaths
American illustrators
Fashion illustrators